ID3 is a metadata container most often used in conjunction with the MP3 audio file format. It allows information such as the title, artist, album, track number, and other information about the file to be stored in the file itself.

The ID3v1 series, in particular, stores genre as an 8-bit number (therefore ranging from 0 to 255, with the latter having the meaning of "undefined" or "not set"), allowing each file to have at most one genre out of a fixed list.

Genre definitions 0-79 follow the ID3 tag specification of 1999. More genres have been successively introduced in later Winamp versions.

ID3v1 defined genres

Specification

Extension by Winamp

References 

ID3Genres
-